The Grande Sauldre is an  long river of central France. Its source is at Humbligny.
It joins with the Petite Sauldre near Salbris to form the Sauldre. The Sandre considers it as the upper course of the Sauldre.

Communes 
 Cher 
 Humbligny, Neuilly-en-Sancerre, Sens-Beaujeu, Le Noyer, Thou, Vailly-sur-Sauldre, Barlieu, Concressault, Blancafort, Argent-sur-Sauldre, Clémont, Brinon-sur-Sauldre

 Loir-et-Cher 
 Pierrefitte-sur-Sauldre

References 

Rivers of Centre-Val de Loire
Rivers of Cher (department)
Rivers of France